Zale peruncta is a species of moth in the family Erebidae. It is found in North America.

The MONA or Hodges number for Zale peruncta is 8684.1.

Subspecies
These two subspecies belong to the species Zale peruncta:
 Zale peruncta incipiens Walker, 1858
 Zale peruncta peruncta

References

Further reading

 
 
 

Omopterini
Articles created by Qbugbot
Moths described in 1852